Menjangan Island is a small island, located 5 miles to the north-west of Bali island and is part of the Indonesian archipelago. "Menjangan" in Indonesian means "Deer". The name was given by the local population observing wild deer herds swimming to the island every spring and covering a distance of approximately 1.2 miles.

Locality
Even though the island is a significant part of Bali Barat National Park, it is assigned to the Javanese administrative district and falls under its jurisdiction. The closest big cities are: Singaraja, located in the north of Bali and Banyuwangi, located on the eastern coast of Java. The closest settlement is Sumberkima village. The nearest airport is Letkol Wisnu regional (approx. 8 miles from the island) and the nearest commercial airport is Banyuwangi International Airport in neighboring province Eastern Java.

General information

Marine life
The island is considered to be an important part of the local tourism industry, because its marine fauna incorporates one of the best-preserved coral reefs in the area. All scuba-diving shops arrange daily trips to the island.

External links

 
 Bali Barat National Park

Islands of Bali
Populated places in Indonesia